A game seven is the final game of a best of seven series. This game can occur in the postseasons for Major League Baseball (MLB) (League Championship Series and World Series), the National Basketball Association (NBA) (all rounds of the NBA playoffs), and the National Hockey League (NHL) (all rounds of the Stanley Cup playoffs).

The game is generally played at the site of the team holding the home advantage across the series.

The nature of a best-of-seven series requires that the series be tied 3–3 going into game seven, such that either team can take the series (advancing further in the playoffs or winning the championship) by winning the game. Because of this decisive nature, game sevens add an element of drama to their sports.

Aside from North American sports leagues, game sevens are also a fixture in many other sports around the world, mostly in baseball, basketball, and ice hockey leagues. Most codes of football do not employ a best-of-seven series (or any best-of-x series in general), hence game sevens are not played in those leagues.

Some playoff rounds (such as MLB's current Division Series) are played in a best of five format, such that game 5 has similar qualities to those described above, though the suspense and drama have less time to build in a shorter series. Furthermore, the World Series of 1903, 1919, 1920, and 1921 were played in a best of nine format, though none of the four went to a decisive game 9.

The game seven is comparable to a final or to a single game in a single-elimination tournament or to a one-game playoff. A championship series' game seven is equivalent to the Super Bowl game in the National Football League in that the game's winner is the league's champion for the season.

Examples

Baseball

Chinese Professional Baseball League
The Chinese Professional Baseball League's championship series, the Taiwan Series, has seen nine series decided in game seven. 

Taiwan Series that were decided in game seven include:

Major League Baseball

In the Major League Baseball postseason, game seven can occur in the League Championship Series and the World Series; a game seven cannot occur in the Division Series of the playoff, which are played as best-of-five series.

In the World Series, there have been 40 decisive game sevens through the 2021 season; visiting teams have won 21 of those games. Note that of the four World Series that were contested on a best-of-nine basis (1903, 1919, 1920, 1921), none went to a game nine, although all four included a non-decisive game seven, which are not included in the below table. World Series that were decided by a game seven:

Basketball

National Basketball Association

All playoff rounds in the National Basketball League (NBA) are now in a best-of-seven series format so all rounds can have a maximum of seven games. The NBA Finals has been consistently played in a best-of-seven series format since its inception. The game sevens where the championship was awarded:

Ice hockey

Kontinental Hockey League
In the Kontinental Hockey League (KHL) playoffs, game seven can occur in all playoff series. The KHL playoffs' final series, the Gagarin Cup Final, has seen five series decided in game seven. 

The game sevens where the Gagarin Cup was awarded are:

Liiga
In Liiga (or Finnish Elite League) playoffs, game seven can occur in all playoff series except the wild-card rounds. The Liiga playoffs' final series has seen several series decided in game seven. 

The game sevens where Liiga awarded gold medals and the Kanada-malja include:

National Hockey League

In the National Hockey League's (NHL) Stanley Cup playoffs, game seven can occur in all playoff series. The Stanley Cup became the NHL's de facto championship trophy in 1926, and the league instituted the best-of-seven series starting in the  season. No Stanley Cup Finals game seven has ever ended with a 1–0 score.

The game sevens where the Stanley Cup was awarded are:

Comebacks
This table below lists teams that, after being down three games to none, have forced a seventh game.

More common, and not enumerated here, are teams that have forced and won a seventh game after being down three games to one.

Successful
In only ten instances (five in major North American sports leagues) has a team been able to come back from being down 0–3 to win a series:

Mike Richards and Jeff Carter are the only players to have been a part of two comebacks from being down 0–3, having played for both the 2009–10 Philadelphia Flyers and the 2013–14 Los Angeles Kings.

Unsuccessful
In the following ten instances, teams were able to force a seventh game in a series after being down 0–3, but lost the final game:

The New York Islanders are the only team to have twice fallen behind 0–3 and then forced a game seven in the same postseason; in the 1975 Stanley Cup Quarterfinals (which they won) and then the 1975 Stanley Cup Semifinals (which they lost).

Major sports leagues

This table summarizes the above results for the three major sports leagues in North America that play seven game series:

References

Baseball terminology
Basketball terminology
Ice hockey rules
 
 
 
Terminology used in multiple sports